Kego Lake is a lake in Crow Wing County, in the U.S. state of Minnesota.

Kego is a name derived from the Ojibwe language meaning "fish".

See also
List of lakes in Minnesota

References

Lakes of Minnesota
Lakes of Crow Wing County, Minnesota